Born to Expire is the debut album by New York City band Leeway. It was recorded in November 1987. Delays postponed its release to January 1989 – jointly on Rock Hotel and Profile Records. It was followed up by Desperate Measures in 1991. In 1996, Another Planet re-issued the album on the same CD as Desperate Measures.

The song "Enforcer" is featured on the LCHC radio station in the 2008 video game Grand Theft Auto IV.

Overview 
Lyrically and vocally, Leeway were firmly rooted in the hardcore punk genre as could also be seen by the company they chose to keep – Corrosion of Conformity, Bad Brains, Circle Jerks, Sick of It All and Prong to name but a few. Musically, however, it was most definitely metal and a compromise label of thrash/crossover was achieved but still left a few questions unanswered. In truth, many fans of both genres had their likes and dislikes – even between songs.

Guitarist and songwriter, A.J. Novello, had this to say on the dichotomy caused by this album:

Most of the songs are played at thrash metal pace but at hardcore punk-style track lengths. The band even had time to experiment with rap and funk on "Catholic High School".

Guitarist Michael Gibbons spoke about the album's signature guitar sound:

Track listing

Credits 
 Eddie Sutton – vocals
 A.J. Novello – guitar
 Michael Gibbons – guitar
 Zowie – bass
 Tony Fontão – drums
 Recorded in November 1987 at Normandy Sound, Warren, Rhode Island
 Produced by Chris Williamson
 Engineered by Tom Soares
 Assistant engineered by Jamie Locke
 Cover art by Bevin Stone
 Mastered by Howie Weinberg at Masterdisk, New York City
 Reissue remastered by Alan Douches at West Westside Music

References

External links 
 Leeway official website

1989 debut albums
Leeway (band) albums